Anfield is a community in the Canadian province of New Brunswick located on Route 395. It is situated in Gordon, a parish of Victoria County.

History

Anfield was originally known as Bungalow Farm before being given its present name in 1916.

See also
List of communities in New Brunswick
List of people from Victoria County, New Brunswick

References

Communities in Victoria County, New Brunswick